Ka'Deem Carey (born October 30, 1992) is an American football running back for the Calgary Stampeders of the Canadian Football League (CFL). He was drafted by the Chicago Bears in the fourth round of the 2014 NFL Draft. He played college football at Arizona, where he was recognized as an All-American.

Early years
Carey attended Canyon del Oro High School in Oro Valley, Arizona. As a junior, he rushed for 2,738 yards on 224 carries with 45 touchdowns. As a senior, he rushed for 1,754 yards with 26 touchdowns.

College career
Carey attended the University of Arizona, where he played for the Arizona Wildcats football team from 2011-2013.  As a true freshman in 2011, Carey rushed for 425 yards on 91 carries with six touchdowns. In 13 games of his sophomore season in 2012, he rushed for 1,929 yards on 303 carries with 23 touchdowns, which broke the Arizona single-season record for both rushing yards and rushing touchdowns. On November 10, 2012 Carey set the Pac-12 record for rushing yards in a game with 366. On December 11, 2012 Carey was named a 2012 consensus All-American at the running back position.

In January 2013, he pleaded not guilty to misdemeanor assault and disorderly conduct charges stemming from an alleged domestic violence. Charges were dropped in June.

Carey served a one-game suspension to start the 2013 football season. During the season, he set a school record for rushing yards and rushing touchdowns. He finished the season with 1,885 yards on 349 carries and 19 touchdowns and was a consensus All-American for the second straight season.

College statistics

Professional career
On January 13, 2014, Carey announced that he would forgo his senior season and enter the 2014 NFL Draft.

Chicago Bears
Carey was drafted by the Chicago Bears in the fourth round with the 117th overall pick of the 2014 NFL Draft. Carey signed a four-year contract on May 13, 2014. In week 13 of 2015, Carey scored his first career rushing touchdown against the San Francisco 49ers on a four-yard run. On December 27, 2015, Carey recorded his first career receiving touchdown in a 26–21 win against the Tampa Bay Buccaneers.

On September 2, 2017, Carey was placed on injured reserve. He was released by the team on September 8, 2017.

Calgary Stampeders 
Carey signed with the Calgary Stampeders of the Canadian Football League (CFL) in early October 2018, nearing the end of the 2018 CFL season. Carey did not play for the Stampeders in 2018, but was on the roster as the team won the 106th Grey Cup. He was re-signed by the club on January 16, 2019, which prevented him from becoming a free agent the following month. In 2019 Carey started to make an impact on offense and was Calgary's leading rusher by midway through the season. On September 23, 2019 the Stampeders announced that Carey would miss the remainder of the season after suffering a broken arm. Carey played in eight games for the Stampeders in 2019, carrying the ball 75 times for 422 yards with two touchdowns; he also caught 15 passes for 134 yards and a touchdown.

See also
 List of NCAA major college football yearly rushing leaders

References

External links
Chicago Bears bio
Arizona Wildcats bio

1992 births
Living people
Players of American football from Tucson, Arizona
All-American college football players
American football running backs
Arizona Wildcats football players
Chicago Bears players
Calgary Stampeders players